Haley Kaye Hudson (born June 14, 1986) is an American actress. She began her career at age 16 after being cast in Disney's remake of Freaky Friday opposite Jamie Lee Curtis and Lindsay Lohan. Hudson played the role of Peg, a member of the rock band Pink Slip and best friend of the main character, played by Lohan. During her teens and 20s, she portrayed many different characters in films and TV shows, including the roles of Debby in Marley & Me, Quinn Hodes in Weeds, Sydney Fields in Terminator: The Sarah Connor Chronicles, and Amanda in both Look and Look: The Series for director Adam Rifkin. In 2012, Hudson starred in the IFC horror film The Pact, which premiered at the Sundance Film Festival to mostly positive reviews. Critics singled her out for her sensitive, visceral portrayal of the blind psychic, Stevie.

Filmography

Television

Discography
2003 - Freaky Friday Soundtrack

External links

1986 births
Living people
Actresses from Los Angeles
American television actresses
21st-century American actresses
American film actresses